Téllez (meaning "son of Tello") is a surname of Spanish origin. It may refer to:
Antonio Téllez, Spanish anarchist activist, journalist and historian
Carmen Helena Téllez, Venezuelan-American music conductor
Dora María Téllez, Nicaraguan historian and Sandinista activist
Gabriel Téllez (Tirso de Molina), Spanish dramatist and poet
Hernando Téllez, Colombian journalist and writer
Lilly Téllez, Mexican journalist
Luis Téllez, Mexican economist
Norberto Téllez, Cuban athlete
Óscar Téllez, Spanish footballer
Roseanne Tellez, American television reporter and anchor
Rowdy Tellez, American baseball player

Surnames from given names
Spanish-language surnames
Patronymic surnames